Michael Horse (born Michael James Heinrich; December 21, 1949) is an American actor known for his portrayals of Native American characters in film and television.

Early life 
Horse was born Michael James Heinrich near Tucson, Arizona, on December 21, 1949. At age 10, Horse moved to Los Angeles. His mother, Nancie Belle Posten, was Swedish. Horse's adoptive father, George Heinrich, was born in Florida to parents from Austria. Nancie died in California in 2004.

Career 
Horse's film debut came in the role of Tonto in the 1981 movie, The Legend of the Lone Ranger, which was a commercial failure. Before taking the role, Horse had been concerned that the character might be perceived as a stereotype.

After appearing in David Lynch's short film The Cowboy and the Frenchman (1988), Horse portrayed Deputy Hawk, a Native American policeman, in Lynch's TV series Twin Peaks (1990–91). He also acted in Passenger 57 (1992), House of Cards (1993), the 1990s version of the television series The Untouchables (1993), and North of 60 (1995–97). He also appeared in the Thanks episode "Thanksgiving" in 1999, portraying Squanto. He appeared as Deputy Owen Blackwood in four episodes of the first season of Roswell (1999). Horse also appeared as Sheriff Tskany in The X-Files episode "Shapes" in 1994. In 1999, Horse guest starred on Walker, Texas Ranger in the season two parter episode Team Cherokee as John Red Cloud, the owner of a Native American NASCAR racing team and a friend of the titular character, Texas Ranger Cordell Walker (Chuck Norris).

Horse portrayed American Indian Movement (AIM) activist Dennis Banks in the 1994 TNT movie Lakota Woman: Siege at Wounded Knee. Eight years later, he lent his voice to "Little Creek's friend" in Spirit: Stallion of the Cimarron. He portrayed Mike Proudfoot on Sons of Tucson. In 1995 he portrayed Dirty Bob in the Western movie Riders in the Storm. He played the character Jindoga in Hawkeye. In 2017, Horse reprised his role as Deputy Hawk in the third season of TV series Twin Peaks.

He also portrayed Twamie Ullulaq in the seventh season of The Blacklist in 2020.

Personal life 
Horse has at times described himself as Yaqui, and at other times as "of Yaqui descent", or "of Yaqui, Mescalero Apache, Zuni Pueblo and Hispanic" descent", but is not enrolled or recognized by any tribe. On November 23, 1993, Horse married Sandra Dee Dombrowski in Nevada. An actress, Dombrowski appeared in episodes of Batman Beyond, The Zeta Project, and Days of Our Lives. As of 2019, on his personal website, Pennie Opal Plant listed herself as his partner.

Filmography

Film

Television

References

External links 
 
 45-minute audio interview of Michael Horse Wide-ranging discussion on Pacifica Radio station KPFA's weekly program, Bay Native Circle (May 7, 2008)

1951 births
Living people
20th-century American painters
21st-century American painters
American illustrators
American jewellers
American male film actors
American male painters
American male television actors
American male voice actors
American people who self-identify as being of Native American descent
Male actors from California
People from Sun Valley, Los Angeles
20th-century American male artists